Florence "Rusty" Tullis (née Steinberg; May 29, 1936 – November 11, 2006), also known as Rusty Dennis, Rusty Mason and Rusty Dennis Mason was an American woman known for being the mother of Rocky Dennis, who was diagnosed with craniodiaphyseal dysplasia. Their story was depicted in the 1985 film Mask, in which Tullis was portrayed by Cher.

Biography

Early life
Tullis was born in Brooklyn. Her father was a truck driver. She had two sisters, Dorothy and Bonnie. Tullis was Jewish.

When she was 13, Tullis got kicked out of junior high school for truancy. At age 14, she began smoking marijuana and riding with bikers. At age 15, she dropped out of school and worked as a "hootchy kootchy" dancer at Coney Island.

Marriages and children

When she was 17, Tullis married her first husband, truck driver Tommy Mason; two years later, their son Joshua was born. The marriage was dysfunctional, and shortly after the birth of Joshua, Tullis moved back with her parents on Coney Island. There, she worked as an exhibit hawker. In 1961, she married her second husband Roy Dennis. That same year, they moved to Covina, California. Their son Roy L. "Rocky" Dennis was born on December 4, 1961.

Although Rocky appeared healthy, an X-ray technologist noticed irregularities in the boy's skull when he was about 2 years old. A battery of tests conducted at UCLA Medical Center confirmed that Rocky had craniodiaphyseal dysplasia, an extremely rare disease in which abnormal calcium deposits in Rocky's skull would distort his face and make it grow to twice its normal size. Doctors told Tullis that her son would experience failing eyesight and hearing and increasingly severe headaches and that the intense pressure would destroy his brain before he turned 7. During the years they lived in Covina and Glendora, California, Tullis insisted that her son lead as normal a life as possible. She ignored doctors who said her son's poor eyesight would prevent him from learning to read, and she disregarded teachers who tried to discourage her from placing him in a public school.

In a 1985 interview with People, Tullis said "They tried to say his intelligence was impaired, but it wasn't true. I think they wanted to keep him out of the classroom because [they thought] it would bother the other kids' parents."

When Rocky was 7, Tullis took him to Las Vegas. In the lobby of the Hacienda Hotel, he spotted a female dwarf as she made her way through the tourists. As she walked by, Rocky began to giggle. "Now do you understand?" Tullis said. "Do you understand why people sometimes treat you the way they do?" Rocky, whose face already was twisted by disease, nodded. "Rocky," his mother said, "everyone can look like anyone else, but no one can look like you. Take pride in that."

Both parents raised Rocky following their divorce, with Rusty having primary responsibility. About three weeks before he died, Rocky's headaches intensified, and he had to resort to a wheelchair. Tullis alerted the hospital that the end was probably near. "He'd said he didn't want to be on one of those machines, and I promised him if the hospital did that I'd pull the plug," she says. "He wanted to die at home." On the night of October 3, 1978, Tullis and a group of biker friends had a party to cheer up Rocky. At midnight, he awoke with a headache; she comforted him, and as she had done since the beginning, sent him to his room to make himself well. The next day, Tullis was at her lawyer's office working out details for beating a drug bust she says was a mistake. Her then-lover Bernie called her at the lawyer's office with the news that Rocky had died. Rocky's body was donated to the UCLA genetics research center for science and then cremated. Tullis married her third husband Bernie Tullis, but they separated after six weeks of marriage, both of them still grief-stricken over Rocky's death. The character Gar, played by Sam Elliott in the 1985 film Mask, is based on Bernie. After Rocky's death, Tullis moved to San Francisco and took up Buddhism. At one point in her life, Tullis resumed the name Mason.

In 1985, Tullis' elder son, Joshua, became a writer based in San Francisco.  A year later, he was diagnosed with Kaposi's sarcoma, a deadly skin cancer, as a result of AIDS. Joshua was homosexual and came out to his mother when he was a teenager. According to Joshua, "My mother has always been very supportive. She didn't want to totally accept it. She wanted me to be bisexual. She wants grandkids. She called me once, a couple of years later. She wanted me to go to a sperm bank. She really wants grandkids. I told her, 'No way!'"  In 1987, Joshua died of AIDS at the age of 32. "People say, 'Oh, it's too bad they died so young,' I say, you don't understand. My kids lived every day of their lives. Every moment," Tullis said of the experience of outliving her two children.

Media portrayal and response

Tullis was paid $15,000 for the film rights to her story, which became the film, Mask. Tullis described the film as a "fairy tale." In an interview with the Chicago Tribune, Tullis said, "I thought Mask was going to be a movie about Rocky. I always thought showing Rocky's courage would help a lot of disabled kids and the parents of disabled kids--sometimes they are more disabled than their kids. I didn't realize the movie would be about me, too. Thanks to Cher's brilliance, I come off a kind of heroine." She also said of Cher's performance, "Cher depicted the way I am very well. I always thought I was perfectly normal, that the rest of the world is nuts."

Later life
At the time of the film's release, Tullis had worked as a counselor helping drug addicts, and she planned to work at the Shanti Project, a workshop for the terminally ill, including patients with AIDS. In 2001, Tullis was reportedly working as a psychic counselor and living in a trailer park outside of Los Angeles. At the time of her death, Tullis was living in Glendora with her sister Dorothy Stuart and her niece Helen Cunningham.

Legal issues
Tullis had a number of run-ins with the law over her drug use over the years.

In 1996, she was sentenced to two years in prison after pleading guilty to a meth possession charge.

In October 1999, she pleaded no contest to two drug charges. Earlier in the year, Azusa police had found methamphetamine and pipes used to smoke the drug in her mobile home. Her two-year prison sentence was changed to probation.

In 2001, she was placed on three years' probation for drug possession.

In May 2002, she was sentenced to 16 months in prison for admitting she violated probation on a drug charge.

She completed a prison sentence for possession of methamphetamines in April 2005.

Death and legacy
On the morning of October 14, 2006, Tullis was driving her three-wheel motorcycle when the right tire fell off and she lost control; she was thrown from the motorcycle after it struck a curb and her body hit a telephone pole. Tullis suffered serious injuries, including both legs broken and a punctured lung. Friends and family members said they had no idea Tullis was hurt until they read a short story in the Oct. 16 issue of the San Gabriel Valley Tribune that reported an unidentified 70-year-old woman on a three-wheel motorcycle had been in an accident. Tullis died of an infection on November 11 that same year at Beverly Hospital in Montebello, California. She was 70. Tullis wanted her body to be donated to science or be cremated.

Anna Hamilton Phelan, screenwriter of Mask, said of Tullis in 2001, "This was not the PTA mother of the year, but she was the perfect mother for Rocky. She never made him feel sorry for himself."

References

External links

1936 births
2006 deaths
American Buddhists
20th-century American Jews
American people convicted of drug offenses
People from Brooklyn
People from Covina, California
People from Glendora, California
People from San Francisco
Road incident deaths in California
21st-century American Jews